Zvuki Mu is the debut and only internationally released album by the Russian band Zvuki Mu, released in 1989 and produced by Brian Eno.

The album was released in Russia in 1998 with a bonus track. This Russian reissue was rereissued in 2013 on vinyl.

Track list 
 The Source of Infection
 Crazy Queen
 Forgotten Sex
 Zero Minus One
 Leave Me Alone
 Krym
 Gadopiatnika
 Paper Flowers
 Traffic Policeman
 Zima (Winter)
 Zima (Dance Remix) – bonus track only on Russian CD and vinyl editions.

External links 
 Zvuki Mu at Discogs (list of versions)

1989 albums
Zvuki Mu albums